Danmarks gamle Folkeviser is a collection of (in principle) all known texts and recordings of the old Danish popular ballads. It drew both on early modern manuscripts, such as Karen Brahes Folio, and much more recent folk-song collecting activity.

It was started in 1853 by Svend Grundtvig. During the nineteenth century, Axel Olrik was also heavily involved, editing volumes 6-8. The work was continued in the twentieth century by new generations of folklorists, and in 1976 comprised 12 volumes, containing 539 ballad types, often with many variants of each type.

Grundtvig's division of the ballad types into categories has mostly been adopted in later ballad collections, e.g. by F. J. Child, and by modern researchers in the field. However, many of the ballads he classed as 'historic' now have been reclassified. Grundtvig's classifications were:

 Kæmpeviser (heroic songs) (vol. 1)
 Trylleviser (magical songs) (vol. 2)
 Historiske viser (historical songs) (vol. 3)
 Ridderviser (romances) (vols 4-5)
 Danske ridderviser (Danish romances) (vols 6-9)

It is now standard practice to refer to the Danish ballad type by its assigned a DgF number.  Variants (or variant groups) are indicated by an alphabet following the DgF number.  Thus "Tord af Havsgaard" (DgF 1A)  for the version taken down from manuscripts, and DgF 1B for the version printed in Vedel's book. Also it is commonplace to refer to ballad titles by Grundtvig's normalized orthography rather than actual spellings occurring in the texts.

Many of the ballads are Danish examples from a family of cognate ballads disseminated throughout Scandinavia. The TSB or The Types of the Scandinavian Medieval Ballad sigla are used to catalog the pan-Scandinavian cognate type to which a ballad may belong. Some of the ballads have cognates in English, and have been cross-referenced against Child Ballad by Larry Syndergaard, English Translations of the Scandinavian Medieval Ballads (1995) (SMB).

English translations of a number of Danish ballads can be found in R. C. Alexander Prior, Ancient Danish Ballads in 3 vols. (1860);  George Borrow, Works; E. M. Smith-Dampier's various publications.

The ballads

See also
List of folk song collections

Footnotes

Explanatory notes

Table notes on additional variants in later DgF volumes

Additional notes

Citations

References 

texts

Vol.1:  (internet archive)
Vol.2:  internet archive or here)
Vol.3:  (internet archive)
Vol.4:  (internet archive or here)
Vol.5:  (2 vols.)
Vol.6:  (internet archive)
Vol.7:  (internet archive)
Vol.8:  (Part 1: 467-474, 1905)
Vol.9: 
Vol.10: 
Vol.10: 
Vol.11: 
Vol.12: 

translations
 
Vol. 1
studies

The Types of the Scandinavian Medieval Ballad (1978)

Ballad collections